First Cornet Streshnev (Georgian:Pirveli korneti Streshniovi) is a 1928 Soviet adventure film directed by Mikheil Chiaureli and Efim Dzigan. It was made in the Georgian Soviet Socialist Republic.

Plot
The events of the film take place during the First World War in 1917 on the Caucasian front. First cornet of the military orchestra Streshnev, not interested in politics faithfully serves his stern commander Colonel Garaburde. The musician learns that on the orders of Colonel a firing squad is prepared for a unit on which his son Streshnev Jr serves. The awakening of class consciousness of the old tsarist army campaigner forces him to join the rebel soldiers and warn his son and comrades of the impending danger.

Cast
 Evstati Tarkhnishvili as Colonel Garaburda  
 A. Gorshenin as Cornet Streshnev  
 Andrey Martynov as Kratov 
 M. Kulakov as Pavle  
 N. Kharitonova as Nurse

References

Bibliography 
 Georges Sadoul & Peter Morris. Dictionary of Film Makers. University of California Press, 1972.

External links 
 

1928 films
Soviet silent feature films
Silent feature films from Georgia (country)
Georgian-language films
Films directed by Mikheil Chiaureli
Soviet black-and-white films
Soviet adventure films
Adventure films from Georgia (country)
Black-and-white films from Georgia (country)
Silent adventure films
Soviet-era films from Georgia (country)